Independent Socialist Republican Party (in French: Parti Républicain Socialiste Indépendant) was a political party in Senegal, formed in 1919 by Blaise Diagne.

In the December 21, 28 1919 municipal elections the multiracial lists of PRSI won in all four municipalities.
African and Black nationalist parties in Africa
African socialist political parties
Political parties established in 1919
Political parties in Senegal
Socialist parties in Senegal